Benjamin Lewis (born 1869) was a Welsh international footballer. He played for Crewe Alexandra, Chester and Wrexham.

References

Year of death missing
Wales international footballers
Crewe Alexandra F.C. players
Chester City F.C. players
Wrexham A.F.C. players
Welsh footballers
1869 births

Association footballers not categorized by position